Norman Anderson (born 1966) better known as Normski,  is a British "broadcaster, photographer … DJ", and rapper, known for his work as a BBC television presenter.

Early life
Anderson was born in northwest London.  He was given his first camera at the age of nine, and was inspired by photographer Horace Ové, whose son was a friend.

Career
Anderson first came to public attention as a member of London's hip-hop scene in the 1980s, and photographed fashion associated with the scene, for magazines including The Face and Vogue.  He also became a fashion designer, using patterns associated with black African cultural heritage.

Described as "larger than life and effusive", Normski fronted BBC television's DEF II and Dance Energy, "youth" shows on BBC2 in the late 1980s and early 1990s.  Normski has also featured in other TV projects, including reality TV shows (e.g. Extreme Celebrity Detox). He interspersed his prose presentation with rhymes and short raps. His involvement in DEF II was an early mainstream outlet for rap in British mass culture.

His photography on the theme of the "Black British experience" has been exhibited at the Victoria and Albert Museum in London.

In August 2008, he appeared in a UK TV advert for yell.com.

He makes regular guest appearances at bars and clubs across the UK and a radio show, The Ride, on Push FM.

His fanzine Darker Shade of White captures images from the 1980s UK hip-hop culture.

Personal life
Normski lived with DEF II producer Janet Street-Porter for four years.

References

External links
  Normski at International Radio Faces

1966 births
British television presenters
British radio presenters
Living people
English people of Jamaican descent
Black British radio presenters
British photographers